The 1985 NCAA Division III football season, part of college football in the United States organized by the National Collegiate Athletic Association at the Division III level, began in August 1985, and concluded with the NCAA Division III Football Championship, also known as the Stagg Bowl, in December 1985 at Garrett-Harrison Stadium in Phenix City, Alabama. The Augustana (IL) Vikings won the third of their four consecutive Division III championships by defeating the Ithaca Bombers by a final score of 20−7.

Conference changes and new programs

Conference standings

Conference champions

Postseason
The 1985 NCAA Division III Football Championship playoffs were the 13th annual single-elimination tournament to determine the national champion of men's NCAA Division III college football. The championship Stagg Bowl game was held at Garrett-Harrison Stadium in Phenix City, Alabama for the eleventh year and first time since 1982. This was the first tournament to feature sixteen teams after expanding from the eight team model in place since 1975.

Playoff bracket

See also
1985 NCAA Division I-A football season
1985 NCAA Division I-AA football season
1985 NCAA Division II football season

References